The Ethereal Mirror is the second full-length album by British doom metal band Cathedral, released in May 1993 through Earache. A widely shared release date of 1 February 1993 was corrected by the band in 2023 after they received a lot of congratulatory messages on social media from people believing the 30th anniversary of the album had been reached. The band posted a correction, stating that they were in fact still in studio in February 1993, and the album was not released until May 24th, ahead of a tour with Penance and Sleep.

Release
Earache re-issued the album in 2009 with the Statik Majik EP as bonus tracks and the DVD Ethereal Reflections as DualDisc.

Track listing

Personnel

Cathedral
 Garry Jennings – guitar, bass
 Lee Dorrian – vocals
 Mark Ramsey Wharton – drums
 Adam Lehan – guitar

Technical personnel
 David Bianco – recording, production, mixing
 Shaun DeFo – engineering
 Dave Patchett – cover painting
 Summer Lacy – inside layout

References

Cathedral (band) albums
1993 albums
Earache Records albums